Souselas e Botão (officially União das Freguesias de Souselas e Botão) is a civil parish in the municipality of Coimbra, Portugal. The population in 2011 was 4,680, in an area of 33.01 km2. It was formed on 28 January 2013 by the merging of freguesias Souselas and Botão.

References 

Freguesias of Coimbra